Raymond J. "Ray" Lesniak (born May 7, 1946) is an American Democratic Party politician, who served in the New Jersey State Senate from 1983 to 2018, where he represented the 20th Legislative District. Before entering New Jersey's upper house, the Senate, Lesniak served in the General Assembly from 1978 to 1983. Lesniak was once considered a major power broker in the Democratic Party, having served as New Jersey Democratic State Chairman and New Jersey Chair for Clinton/Gore and Gore/Lieberman. Lesniak finished a distant fourth place as a candidate for Governor of New Jersey in the 2017 election.

Personal life
Lesniak grew up in Elizabeth, New Jersey. He served in the U.S. Army from 1967 to 1969, then earned his A.B. in economics from Rutgers University in 1971, and his J.D. from St. John's University School of Law in 1974. He is an attorney with the firm Weiner Lesniak.

Lesniak is ethnically Polish.

In 2018, Lesniak married Salena Carroll, his girlfriend of 20 years, just a year before she died of unknown causes.

He has a niece, Suzanne Devanney, and three nephews, George Devanney Jr., Daniel Devanney, and Christopher Devanney.

Political career
In 1980, Lesniak ran for the office of Mayor of Elizabeth. He was defeated by incumbent mayor Thomas G. Dunn, whom he challenged in the Democratic primary election.  Dunn scored about 7,100 votes to Lesniak's 6,600 while about 2,000 went to David Conti, the challenger who came 276 votes away from toppling Dunn in 1976 and was (in 1980) endorsed by the Regular Democratic Organization of Union County.

Subsequently, Dunn orchestrated Lesniak's removal from the 'party line' -- a preferred ballot position aligned with almost all other incumbents—when it was time for the lawmaker to seek re-election to the General Assembly in 1981.  Party leaders did not inform Lesniak about his loss of support until two days before the petition filing deadline. Elizabeth Health Director John Surmay was selected to replace Lesniak on the ballot between Sen. John T. Gregorio and Assemblyman Thomas J. Deverin, his prior running mates. 

Building on the organization assembled during his race for mayor, the Elizabeth Democratic Association, Lesniak waged a campaign with support from organized labor, environmentalists, minority communities, and others. On June 6, 1981, Lesniak won renomination with approximately 20% more than the number of votes cast for Deverin and almost twice as many ballots as Dunn's proxy, Surmay.

In a June 1983 special election, Lesniak won the Senate seat of John T. Gregorio who was forced to vacate his office after being convicted of hiding his ownership of a pair of Linden go-go bars.

Lesniak serves on the Economic Growth Committee (as Chair), Commerce Committee (as vice-chair), the Legislative Services Commission, the Judiciary Committee and the Legislative Oversight Committee.

Lesniak has also been involved in national politics over the course of his tenure. In 1996, he was Chairman of the New Jersey Clinton-Gore Presidential Campaign, and in 2000 he was a key insider in the Al Gore campaign. Lesniak served as Chairman of the New Jersey Democratic State Committee, and Chairman of the 1997 Jim McGreevey campaign for Governor of New Jersey.

Legislation
Early in his tenure, he sponsored landmark environmental policies, such as the Environmental Cleanup Responsibility Act (now known as the Industrial Site Recovery Act), the Safe Drinking Water Act, and the Pesticide Control Act, making New Jersey first-in-the-nation to tackle such issues. The laws hold polluters responsible for their actions and have resulted in cleaner drinking water for New Jersey residents.

Lesniak has championed the abolition of the death penalty in New Jersey (after having voted for its reinstatement in 1982); the Marriage Equality Act; and environmental initiatives to clean up one of the most heavily industrialized regions in the nation. He has worked with The Humane Society and other animal rights organizations.

In 2014, Lesniak announced his plan to pass a bill that would legalize sports betting for racetracks and casinos in New Jersey, challenging the Professional and Amateur Sports Protection Act of 1992. After the Supreme Court refused the NJ appeal toward PASPA overturn in 2013, Ray Lesniak made revisions to his sports betting bill and got them approved by the US Department of Justice. Even though the new version of the bill was first vetoed by Governor Christie, Lesniak didn't stop revising it until the State Assembly finally passed S.B. 2460, and Christie signed it into law, claiming it to be a “bipartisan legislative effort.” Several more lawsuits and court appeals later, the Supreme Court of the United States overturned the Professional and Amateur Sports Protection Act in 2018.

In October 2016, Lesniak introduced a bill dubbed "Pedals' Law" that would ban black bear hunting in New Jersey for five years. This was in response to the killing of the bipedal bear Pedals by a hunter.

District 20
Each of the forty districts in the New Jersey Legislature has one representative in the New Jersey Senate and two members in the New Jersey General Assembly. The other representatives from the 20th district for the 2014–2015 Legislative Session are:
Assemblywoman Annette Quijano
Assemblyman Jamel Holley

2017 gubernatorial campaign 
Lesniak first announced his intention to run for governor of New Jersey in 2016. He then switched to saying he would no longer seek the Democratic nomination in October, after Phil Murphy gathered early support from county leaders around the state. However, he announced in early January he was indeed running and filed the appropriate paperwork officially putting him in the race.

On June 6, 2017, he lost the primary, placing in a distant fourth behind Murphy, Jim Johnson, and John Wisniewski.

First BankAmericano directorship 
On February 9, 2010, The Wall Street Journal published a copy of a letter from Senator Robert Menendez to the Federal Reserve pushing for approval of a deal for the sale of First BankAmericano of Elizabeth where State Senator Lesniak served on the board of directors. A media controversy arose due to  BankAmericano's political connections. Its board members included several major campaign contributors to Menendez – among them State Senator Lesniak.  Following the media controversy over the bailout request, it was disclosed that Lesniak had also received "insider loans" from the bank. Prior to the bailout request, First BankAmericano had been under financial pressure for more than a year because of mounting loan losses. A highly critical report by the Federal Deposit Insurance Corp.(FDIC) also found the institution had engaged in unsafe or unsound banking practices, including "operating without adequate supervision by its board of directors", an excessive level of delinquent or bad loans, inadequate earnings and insufficient coverage of its assets.

Awards and honors
In 1982, Lesniak was named "Citizen of the Year" by Polish American World, and "Man of the Year" in 1991, by the Jewish National Fund, and the American Cancer Society. In 2003, he was awarded "Legislator of the Year" by the Medical Society of New Jersey for working to make healthcare more affordable and accessible, expanding the PAAD low-cost prescription drug program to cover more seniors and expanding cancer and diabetes research and education.

Lesniak was the grand marshal of the Pulaski Day Parade in New York City in 2004.

In 2009, Lesniak won the Mémorial de Caen International Human Rights Award in Normandy, France; one of only two Americans to ever do so, with the speech "The Road To Justice and Peace."

On September 30, 2014, the Raymond J. Lesniak Experience, Strength and Hope Recovery High School on the Kean University campus was inaugurated, New Jersey's first recovery high school, a program designed for youths battling drug and alcohol addiction. Lesniak, who championed the creation of the program has sponsored legislation to start similar schools in New Jersey.

Election history

References

External links
District 20 Webpage
Senator Lesniak's legislative webpage , New Jersey Legislature
New Jersey Legislature financial disclosure forms
2011  2010  2009  2008  2007  2006  2005  2004 
New Jersey Senate Democrats biography of Senator Lesniak

|-

|-

|-

1946 births
Living people
21st-century American politicians
American politicians of Polish descent
Candidates in the 2017 United States elections
Converts to Protestantism from Roman Catholicism
Democratic Party members of the New Jersey General Assembly
New Jersey lawyers
Democratic Party New Jersey state senators
Politicians from Elizabeth, New Jersey
Rutgers University alumni
St. John's University (New York City) alumni